Head Lake Water Aerodrome  is located on Head Lake,  west of Norland, Ontario, Canada.

References

Registered aerodromes in Ontario
Seaplane bases in Ontario